East Wales refers to either a ITL 3 statistical region of Wales or generally a region encompassing the easternmost parts of the country.

Usage
The UK Office for National Statistics has as its highest level sub-division, East Wales, covering the whole east side of the country. It is defined as Powys, Flintshire and Wrexham, Monmouthshire and Newport, and Cardiff and Vale of Glamorgan. (The remainder of Wales is termed 'West Wales and The Valleys').

Sport
Welsh Athletics has four regions (East, West, North and South), with leagues for various disciplines having regional and inter-region competitions, particularly at school levels. The East Wales region covers Blaenau Gwent, Caerphilly (eastern half), Monmouthshire, Newport, South Powys and Torfaen.

The East Wales Bridge Association is one of four in Wales, the others being Mid, West and North. The East Wales Association has clubs in the historic counties of Glamorgan, Monmouthshire and Brecknockshire.

Rivers
Rivers in East Wales include:
 River Usk
 Ebbw River
 River Llynfi
 Sirhowy River

Some Notable People of East Wales
 St. Tegfedd (Llandegveth)
 Ian Gough
 Taulupe Faletau
 Aneurin Bevan
 Ellis Shipp

Places of Interest
 Stadiwm Cwmbrân
 Cwmbran Centre, The second largest shopping centre in Wales
 Ysgyryd Fawr
 Mynydd Pen-y-fâl 
 Clawdd Offa
 Abaty Tyndyrn
 Parc Pont-y-pŵl
 Blaenafon World Heritage Site

See also
 Geography of Wales
 Mid Wales
 North Wales
 South Wales
 West Wales
 List of Welsh principal areas by percentage Welsh language
 Subdivisions of Wales

References

Regions of Wales
NUTS 2 statistical regions of the United Kingdom